Schiess or Schieß is a surname. Notable people with the surname include:

Albert Schiess (born 1951), Swiss sailor
Betty Bone Schiess (1923–2017), American Episcopal priest
Claudia Schiess (born 1989), Ecuadorian beauty queen
Douglas Schiess (born 1970), American Space Force major general
Emanuel Schiess (1875–1948), Swiss footballer
Ferdinand Schiess (1856–1884), Swiss recipient of the Victoria Cross
Gabriela Andersen-Schiess (born 1945), former Swiss long-distance runner
Heinrich Schiess-Gemuseus (1833–1914), Swiss ophthalmologist
Johann Ulrich Schiess (1813–1883), Swiss politician
Louis Schiess (born 1925), Swiss sailor
Robert Schiess (1896–1956), Swiss painter and member of the Pontifical Swiss Guard
Walter Schiess (1898–1959), Swiss magazine editor
Franz Schieß (1921–1943), German fighter ace

See also